Rarities is a Beach Boys compilation album released in 1983 by Capitol Records. It is a collection of outtakes, alternate mixes and B-sides recorded between 1962 and 1970. Included are songs written or made popular by the Beatles, the Box Tops, Stevie Wonder, Ersel Hickey and Lead Belly. Also featured are several standards, such as "The Lord's Prayer" and "Auld Lang Syne". The album sold poorly and quickly went out of print.

Track listing
"With a Little Help from My Friends" (John Lennon, Paul McCartney) – 2:22
"The Letter" (Wayne Carson) – 1:47
"I Was Made to Love Her" [alternate version] (Henry Cosby, Lula Mae Hardaway, Sylvia Moy, Stevie Wonder) – 2:34
 Included on the 2017 compilation 1967 – Sunshine Tomorrow
"You're Welcome" (Brian Wilson) – 1:06
 Found as a bonus track on the 1990 CD release of Smiley Smile/Wild Honey
"The Lord's Prayer" (Albert Hay Malotte) – 2:31
Found on the 1991 CD release of The Beach Boys' Christmas Album 
"Bluebirds over the Mountain (two-track mix)" (Ersel Hickey) – 2:49
Found on the 1998 CD release of The Dutch Singles Collection 
"Celebrate the News" (Dennis Wilson, Gregg Jakobson) – 3:03
 Found as a bonus track on the 1990 CD release of Friends/20/20
"Good Vibrations" [alternate version] (B. Wilson, Mike Love) – 3:33
 Found on the 2006 40th Anniversary CD single for Good Vibrations 
"Land Ahoy" (B. Wilson) – 1:42
 Found as a bonus track on the 1990 CD release of Surfin' Safari/Surfin' U.S.A. 
"In My Room [German version]" (B. Wilson, Gary Usher) – 2:15
 Found as a bonus track on the 1990 CD release of Surfer Girl/Shut Down Volume 2 
"Cottonfields" (Lead Belly) – 3:02
 Can be found on The Greatest Hits – Volume 2: 20 More Good Vibrations and the Good Vibrations: Thirty Years of The Beach Boys box set
"All I Want to Do" [live] (D. Wilson) – 1:39
 A longer version appears on Made in California
"Auld Lang Syne" (Traditional) – 1:11
 Found on the 1991 CD release of The Beach Boys' Christmas Album

CD bonus tracks 
"Medley: Good Vibrations/Help Me, Rhonda/I Get Around/Little Deuce Coupe/Little Honda/Hawaii/409/Noble Surfer/Dance, Dance, Dance/Shut Down/Surfin' Safari/Barbara Ann/Surfin' U.S.A./Fun, Fun, Fun" [Up Tempo Version] – 6:51 
"Medley: Surfer Girl/Girls on the Beach/Ballad of Ole' Betsy/We'll Run Away/Caroline, No/The Surfer Moon/In My Room" [Ballad Version] – 9:39
"Beach Boys Medley: Good Vibrations/Help Me, Rhonda/I Get Around/Shut Down/Surfin' Safari/Barbara Ann/Surfin' U.S.A./Fun, Fun, Fun" [Single Version] – 4:10

Reviews

In a brief review, AllMusic's William Ruhlmann called Rarities a collection of "alternate takes, surprising cover versions, and different mixes of familiar songs make this a delight for collectors and hard-core fans. To anyone else, it's pleasant but non-essential."

References

1983 compilation albums
The Beach Boys compilation albums